The War of 1812 (18 June 1812 – 17 February 1815) was fought by the United States of America and its indigenous allies against the United Kingdom and its allies in British North America, with limited participation by Spain in Florida. It began when the United States declared war on 18 June 1812 and, although peace terms were agreed upon in the December 1814 Treaty of Ghent, did not officially end until the peace treaty was ratified by Congress on 17 February 1815.

Tensions originated in long-standing differences over territorial expansion in North America and British support for Native American tribes who opposed U.S. colonial settlement in the Northwest Territory. These escalated in 1807 after the Royal Navy began enforcing tighter restrictions on American trade with France and press-ganged men they claimed as British subjects, even those with American citizenship certificates. Opinion in the U.S. was split on how to respond, and although majorities in both the House and Senate voted for war, they divided along strict party lines, with the Democratic-Republican Party in favour and the Federalist Party against. News of British concessions made in an attempt to avoid war did not reach the U.S. until late July, by which time the conflict was already underway.

At sea, the far larger Royal Navy imposed an effective blockade on U.S. maritime trade, while between 1812 to 1814 British regulars and colonial militia defeated a series of American attacks on Upper Canada. This was balanced by the US winning control of the Northwest Territory with victories at Lake Erie and the Thames in 1813. The abdication of Napoleon in early 1814 allowed the British to send additional troops to North America and the Royal Navy to reinforce their blockade, crippling the American economy. In August 1814, negotiations began in Ghent, with both sides wanting peace; the British economy had been severely impacted by the trade embargo, while the Federalists convened the Hartford Convention in December to formalise their opposition to the war.

In August 1814, British troops burned Washington, before American victories at Baltimore and Plattsburgh in September ended fighting in the north. Fighting continued in the Southeastern United States, where in late 1813 a civil war had broken out between a Creek faction supported by Spanish and British traders and those backed by the U.S. Supported by U.S. militia under General Andrew Jackson, the U.S.-backed Creeks won a series of victories, culminating in the capture of Pensacola in November 1814. In early 1815, Jackson defeated a British attack on New Orleans, catapulting him to national celebrity and later victory in the 1828 United States presidential election. News of this success arrived in Washington at the same time as that of the signing of the Treaty of Ghent, which essentially restored the position to that prevailing before the war. While Britain insisted this included lands belonging to their Native American allies prior to 1811, as Congress did not recognize them as independent nations, the Americans did not comply with these provisions and the British made no effort to compel them to do so. The Native Americans were subsequently pushed west of the Mississippi River.

Origin 

Since the conclusion of the War of 1812, historians have long debated the relative weight of the multiple reasons underlying its origins.

During the nineteenth century, historians generally concluded that war was declared largely over national honour, neutral maritime rights and the British seizure of neutral ships and their cargoes on the high seas. This theme was the basis of President James Madison's war message to Congress on June 1, 1812. At the turn of the 20th century, much of the contemporary scholarship re-evaluated this explanation and began to focus more on non-maritime factors as significant contributing causes as well. However, historian Warren H. Goodman warns that too much focus on these ideas can be equally misleading.

Historian Richard Maass argues that the expansionist theme is a myth that goes against the "relative consensus among experts that the primary American objective was the repeal of British maritime restrictions". He says that scholars agree that the United States went to war "because six years of economic sanctions had failed to bring Britain to the negotiating table, and threatening the Royal Navy's Canadian supply base was their last hope". Maass agrees that expansionism might have tempted Americans on a theoretical level, but he finds that "leaders feared the domestic political consequences of doing so", particularly because such expansion "focused on sparsely populated western lands rather than the more populous eastern settlements". To what extent that American leaders considered the question of pursuing territory in Canada, those questions "arose as a result of the war rather than as a driving cause." However, Maass accepts that many historians continue to believe that expansionism was a cause.

Reginald Horsman sees expansionism as a secondary cause after maritime issues, noting that many historians have mistakenly rejected expansionism as a cause for the war. He notes that it was considered key to maintaining sectional balance between free and slave states thrown off by American settlement of the Louisiana Territory and widely supported by dozens of War Hawk congressmen such as Henry Clay, Felix Grundy, John Adams Harper and Richard Mentor Johnson, who voted for war with expansion as a key aim. However, Horsman states that in his view "the desire for Canada did not cause the War of 1812" and that "The United States did not declare war because it wanted to obtain Canada, but the acquisition of Canada was viewed as a major collateral benefit of the conflict".

However, other historians believe that a desire to permanently annex Canada was a direct cause of the war. Carl Benn notes that the War Hawks' desire to annex the Canadas was similar to the enthusiasm for the annexation of Spanish Florida by inhabitants of the American South as both expected war to facilitate expansion into long-desired lands and end support for hostile tribes (Tecumseh's Confederacy in the North and the Creek in the South).
 
Alan Taylor says that many Democratic-Republican congressmen such as John Adams Harper, Richard Mentor Johnson and Peter Buell Porter "longed to oust the British from the continent and to annex Canada". A few Southerners opposed this, fearing an imbalance of free and slave states if Canada was annexed. Anti-Catholicism also caused many to oppose annexing the mainly Catholic Lower Canada, believing its French-speaking inhabitants unfit "for republican citizenship". 

Even major figures such as Henry Clay and James Monroe expected to keep at least Upper Canada in an easy conquest. Notable American generals such as William Hull issued proclamations to Canadians during the war promising republican liberation through incorporation into the United States. General Alexander Smyth similarly declared to his troops when they invaded Canada that "you will enter a country that is to become one of the United States. You will arrive among a people who are to become your fellow-citizens". However, a lack of clarity about American intentions undercut these appeals.

David and Jeanne Heidler argue that "most historians agree that the War of 1812 was not caused by expansionism but instead reflected a real concern of American patriots to defend United States' neutral rights from the overbearing tyranny of the British Navy. That is not to say that expansionist aims would not potentially result from the war". However, they also argue otherwise, saying that "acquiring Canada would satisfy America's expansionist desires", also describing it as a key goal of western expansionists who, they argue, believed that "eliminating the British presence in Canada would best accomplish" their goal of halting British support for tribal raids. They argue that the "enduring debate" is over the relative importance of expansionism as a factor, and whether "expansionism played a greater role in causing the War of 1812 than American concern about protecting neutral maritime rights".

In the 1960s, the work of Norman K. Risjord, Reginald Horsman, Bradford Perkins and Roger Brown established a new eastern maritime consensus. While these authors approached the origins of the war from many perspectives, they all conceded that British maritime policy was the principal cause of the war.

Honour and the "second war of independence" 
As historian Norman K. Risjord notes, a powerful motivation for the Americans was their threatened sense of independence and the desire to uphold national honour in the face of what they considered British aggression and insults such as the Chesapeake–Leopard affair. H. W. Brands writes: "The other war hawks spoke of the struggle with Britain as a second war of independence; [Andrew] Jackson, who still bore scars from the first war of independence, held that view with special conviction. The approaching conflict was about violations of American rights, but it was also about vindication of American identity". Some Americans at the time and some historians since have called it a "Second War of Independence" for the United States.

The young republic had been involved in several struggles to uphold what it regarded as its rights, and honour, as an independent nation. The First Barbary War had resulted in an apparent victory but with the continued payment of ransoms. The Quasi-War against the French had involved single ship naval clashes over trade rights similar to the ones about to occur with Britain. Upholding national honour and being able to protect American rights was part of the background to the US political and diplomatic attitudes towards Britain in the early 1800s.

At the same time, the British public were offended by what they considered insults, such as the Little Belt affair. This gave them a particular interest in capturing the American flagship President, an act that they successfully realized in 1815. They were also keen to maintain what they saw as their rights to stop and search neutral vessels as part of their war with France, and further ensure that their own commercial interests were protected.

Impressment, trade, and naval actions 
Britain was the largest trading partner of the United States, receiving 80 percent of American cotton and 50 percent of all other American exports. The British public and press resented the growing mercantile and commercial competition.
Historian Reginald Horsman states that "a large section of influential British opinion [...] thought that the United States presented a threat to British maritime supremacy".

During the Seven Years' War, Britain introduced rules governing trade with their enemies. The Rule of 1756, which the U.S. had temporarily agreed to when signing the Jay Treaty, stated that a neutral nation could not conduct trade with an enemy, if that trade was closed to them before hostilities had commenced. Since the beginning of Britain's war with France in 1793, the U.S. merchant marine had been making a fortune continuing trading with both nations, America's share of trans-Atlantic trade growing from 250 thousand tons in 1790 to 981 thousand tons in 1810, in the process. 

Of particular concern to the British was the transport of goods from the French West Indies to France, something the U.S. would have been unable to do, due to French rules, during times of peace. The United States' view was that the treaty they had signed violated their right to trade with others, and in order to circumvent the Rule of 1756, American ships would stop at a neutral port to unload and reload their cargo before continuing to France. These actions were challenged in the Essex case of 1805.

In 1806, with parts of the Jay Treaty due to expire, a new agreement was sought. The Monroe–Pinkney Treaty offered the U.S. preferential trading rights and would have settled most its issues with Britain. However, the treaty did not moderate the Rule of 1756 and only offered to exercise "extreme caution" and "immediate and prompt redress" with regard to impressment of Americans. Jefferson, who had specifically asked for these two points to be extirpated, refused to put the treaty before the senate.

In 1806, Napoleon's Berlin Decree declared a blockade of the British Isles, forbade neutral vessels harbour in British ports, and declared all British made goods carried on neutral ships lawful prizes of war. The British responded in 1807 with Orders in Council which similarly forbade any shipping to France. By 1807, when Napoleon introduced his Milan Decree, declaring all ships touching at British ports to be legitimate prizes of war, it had become almost impossible for the U.S. to remain neutral. Between 1804 and 1807, 731 American ships were seized by Britain or France for violation of one of the blockades, roughly two thirds by Britain. Since the Jay Treaty, France had also adopted an aggressive attitude to American neutrality. 

Whereas Britain, through a process known as pre-emption, compensated American ship owners for their losses, France did not. French frigates burned American grain ships heading for Britain and treated American sailors as prisoners of war. U.S.–French relations had soured so much that by 1812, Madison was also considering war with France.

As a result of these increasing trade volumes during the Napoleonic Wars the United States Merchant Marine became the world's largest neutral shipping fleet. Between 1802 and 1810, it nearly doubled, which meant that there were insufficient numbers of experienced sailors in the United States to man it. To overcome this shortfall, British seamen were recruited, who were attracted by the better pay and conditions. It was estimated that 30% (23,000) of the 70,000 men employed on American ships were British. During the Napoleonic Wars, the British Royal Navy expanded to 600 ships, requiring 140,000 sailors. 

The Royal Navy could man its ships with volunteers in peacetime, but in wartime, competing with merchant shipping and privateers for the pool of experienced sailors, it turned to impressment from ashore and at sea. Since 1795 the Quota System had been in use to feed men to the navy but it was not alone sufficient. Though most saw it as necessary, the practice of impressment was detested by most Britons. It was illegal under British law to impress foreign sailors, but it was the accepted practice of the era for nations to retrieve seamen of their own nationality from foreign navies during times of war. However, in the nineteen years Britain was at war with France prior to the war of 1812 some ten thousand American citizens were impressed into the British navy.

The American ambassador in London, James Monroe, under President Thomas Jefferson, protested to the British Foreign Office that more than fifteen thousand Americans had been impressed into the Royal Navy since March 1803. When asked for a list however, the Madison administration was only able to produce one based on hearsay containing 6,257 names, many of which were duplicated. The list also included some who had legitimately volunteered to serve. By 1804 the incidents of impressment of Americans had sharply increased. Underlying the dispute was the issue that Britain and the United States viewed nationality differently. The United States believed that British seamen, including naval deserters, had a right to become American citizens. In reality few actually went through the formal process. 

Regardless Britain did not recognize a right for a British subject to relinquish his citizenship and become a citizen of another country. The Royal Navy therefore considered any American citizen subject to impressment if he was born British. American reluctance to issue formal naturalization papers and the widespread use of unofficial or forged identity or protection papers among sailors made it difficult for the Royal Navy to tell native born-Americans from naturalized-Americans and even non-Americans, and led it to impress some American sailors who had never been British. 

Though Britain was willing to release from service anyone who could establish their American citizenship, the process often took years while the men in question remained impressed in the British Navy. However, from 1793 to 1812 up to 15,000 Americans had been impressed while many appeals for release were simply ignored or dismissed for other reasons. There were also cases when the United States Navy also impressed British sailors. Once impressed, any seaman, regardless of citizenship, could accept a recruitment bounty and was then no longer considered impressed but a "volunteer", further complicating matters.

American anger with Britain grew when Royal Navy frigates were stationed just outside American harbours in view of American shores to search ships for goods bound to France and impress men within the United States territorial waters. Well-publicized events outraged the American public such as the Leander affair and the Chesapeake–Leopard affair.

The British public were outraged by the Little Belt affair in which the larger USS President in search of HMS Guerriere instead clashed with a small British sloop, resulting in the deaths of 11 British sailors. While both sides claimed the other fired first, the British public particularly blamed the United States for attacking a smaller vessel, with calls in some newspapers for revenge. President had sighted and chased HMS Little Belt trying to determine her identity throughout the afternoon. 

The first shot took place after an exchange of hails had still failed to identify either ship to the other in the growing dusk. After 45 minutes of battle, taking place in darkness, Little Belt had received much damage, with several holes to her hull near the water-line and her rigging "cut to pieces". Presidents Captain Rodgers claimed Little Belt had fired first; but he did not ascertain her size or country of origin until dawn. After sending over a boat, Rodgers expressed regret and apologized for the 'unfortunate affair'. 

Little Belts Captain Bingham claimed the opposite: President had fired first and had been manoeuvering in such a way as to make him think she was planning an attack. Historian Jonathon Hooks echoes the view of Alfred T. Mahan and several other historians, that it is impossible to determine who fired the first shot. Both sides held inquiries which upheld their captain's actions and version of events. Meanwhile, the American public regarded the incident as just retribution for the Chesapeake–Leopard affair and were encouraged by their victory over the Royal Navy, while the British regarded it as unprovoked aggression.

Canada and the U.S. 

Whether the annexation of Canada was a primary American war objective has been debated by historians. Some argue it was an outcome of the failure to change British policy through economic coercion or negotiation, leaving invasion as the only way for the US to place pressure on Britain. This view was summarised by Secretary of State James Monroe, who said "[i]t might be necessary to invade Canada, not as an object of the war but as a means to bring it to a satisfactory conclusion". Occupation would also disrupt supplies to colonies in the British West Indies and Royal Navy, and prevent the British arming their allies among the Indian nations of the Northwest Territory.

Nevertheless, even though President Madison claimed permanent annexation was not an objective, he recognised once acquired it would be "difficult to relinquish". A large faction in Congress actively advocated this policy, including Richard Mentor Johnson, who stated "I shall never die content until I see England's expulsion from North America and her territories incorporated into the United States". John Adams Harper claimed "the Author of Nature Himself had marked our limits in the south, by the Gulf of Mexico, and on the north, by the regions of eternal frost". Both saw the war as part of a divine plan to unify the US and Canada, Johnson being its leading exponent.

Others considered annexation a matter of domestic economic and political necessity. Tennessee Congressman Felix Grundy was one of many who saw it as essential to preserve the balance between slave states and free states that might be disrupted by the incorporation of territories in the Southeast acquired in the 1803 Louisiana Purchase. Control of the St. Lawrence River, the major outlet for trade between Europe and the Great Lakes region, was a long-standing American ambition, going back to the early years of the Revolutionary War, and supported by powerful economic interests in the North-West. Madison also viewed it as a way to prevent American smugglers using the river as a conduit for undercutting his trade policies.

All these groups assumed American troops would be greeted as liberators, guaranteeing an easy conquest. Thomas Jefferson believed taking "...Canada this year, as far as...Quebec, will be a mere matter of marching, and will give us the experience for the attack on Halifax, the next and final expulsion of England from the American continent". In 1812, Canada had around 525,000 inhabitants, two thirds of whom were French-speakers living in Quebec. Upper Canada, now southern Ontario, had a population of less than 75,000, primarily Loyalist exiles and recent immigrants from the Northeastern United States. The former were implacably hostile to the United States; the latter largely uninterested in politics and their loyalties unknown; unlike the Texas annexation in 1845, they were too few to provide a critical mass of pro-American support, while many followed their Loyalist neighbours and joined Canadian militia. Absence of local backing prevented American forces from establishing a foothold in the area,  and of ten attempts to invade Upper Canada between 1812 and 1814, the vast majority ended in failure.

U.S. policy in the Northwest Territory

The Northwest Territory, a region between the Great Lakes, the Ohio River, Appalachians, and Mississippi, was a long-standing source of conflict in 18th and early 19th-century North America. This arose when settlers from the Thirteen Colonies moved onto lands owned by the indigenous inhabitants, a collection of Algonquian and Iroquoian-speaking peoples, chiefly the Shawnee, Wyandot, Lenape, Miami, Potawatomi, Kickapoo, Menominee, and Odawa. When Pontiac's War was defeated in 1766, they generally accepted British sovereignty but retained ownership of their lands, while the Proclamation of 1763 prohibited colonial settlement west of the Appalachians, a grievance that contributed to the outbreak of the American Revolutionary War.

The territory was ceded in 1783 to the new American government, who encouraged its citizens to settle in the region and ignored the rights of local inhabitants. In response, the tribes formed the Northwestern Confederacy which from 1786 to 1795 fought against the U.S. in the Northwest Indian War, with military support provided by British forts along the Maumee River. After the 1794 Jay Treaty, the British handed over these strongpoints to the U.S., most notably Fort Detroit, and abandoned their indigenous allies, who signed the 1795 Treaty of Greenville with the American government. Under the treaty, they ceded most of what is now the state of Ohio but granted title to the rest of their lands in perpetuity, a commitment the U.S. government had already secretly agreed to ignore.

A key factor in this policy was the acquisition by France of the Louisiana Territory in 1800, which meant the U.S. faced an expansionist power on its northwestern border, rather than a weak Spain. To ensure control of the Upper Mississippi River, President Thomas Jefferson incorporated the region into the Indiana Territory, which originally contained the modern states of Indiana, Illinois, Michigan, and Wisconsin. He appointed William Henry Harrison as governor, ordering him to acquire as much land as possible beyond the Greenville line, using deception if needed. In doing so, Harrison was helped by vague and competing claims, since tribes whose title to the lands was either limited or disputed were happy to sign them away in return for bribes. Although the December 1803 Louisiana Purchase ended the French threat, between 1803 and 1805 he obtained extensive territorial cessions in the treaties of Fort Wayne (1803), St Louis, Vincennes and Grouseland.

The policies adopted by Harrison meant low-level conflict between local tribes and American settlers quickly escalated post-1803. In 1805, a Shawnee leader named Tenskwatawa launched a nativist religious movement that rejected American culture and values, while his elder brother Tecumseh organized a new confederacy to defend their territory against settler encroachment.  They established a community at Prophetstown in 1808, gaining support from young warriors and traditional chiefs including the Wyandot leader Roundhead and Main Poc from the Potawatomi. The Sioux, Sauk, Meskwaki, and Ojibwe peoples, who lived along the Upper Mississippi and Western Great Lakes, initially rejected Tenskwatawa's message because of their dependence on the fur trade, but continued settler incursions into their lands meant they too became hostile to the U.S.

Britain traditionally maintained good relations with the local people by handing out gifts, including arms and ammunition; after 1795, they ended this policy and advised the tribes to live peacefully with the American government. Their position changed following the 1808 Chesapeake-Leopard Affair, when the Northwest came to be seen as a buffer against an American attack on Upper Canada. They re-started the distribution of gifts and offered the tribes a defensive alliance if war broke out with the U.S., while urging them to refrain from aggressive action in the meantime. The situation worsened after the 1809 Treaty of Fort Wayne; negotiated primarily with the Lenape, it included lands claimed by the Shawnee and Tecumseh insisted it was invalid without the consent of all the tribes.

In 1811, alarmed at the threat posed by Tecumseh and Tenskwatawa, Harrison secured permission to attack them. Taking advantage of Tecumseh's absence, he marched on Prophetstown with an army of nearly 1,000 men; in the ensuing Battle of Tippecanoe, the Americans first repulsed an attack by forces under Tenskwatawa, then destroyed Prophetstown. Fighting along the frontier escalated, while Tecumseh reconstituted his confederacy and allied with the British. This action strengthened American hostility against Britain in the run up to the War of 1812, with many blaming them for unrest on the frontier, rather than government policy. in the ensuing conflict, most of the Northwest nations supported the British, including the previously neutral tribes of the Upper Mississippi.

Internal American political conflict 

The United States was in a period of significant political conflict between the Federalist Party (based mainly in the Northeast) and the Democratic-Republican Party (with its greatest power base in the South and West). The Federalists, who sympathized with Britain and their struggle with Napoleonic France, were criticized by the Democratic-Republicans for being too close to Britain, while the Federalists countered that the Democratic-Republicans were allied to France, a country headed by Napoleon, who was seen as a dictator. 

The Federalist Party favoured a strong central government and closer ties to Britain. The Democratic-Republican Party favoured a smaller central government, preservation of states' rights (including slavery), westward expansion and a stronger break with Britain. By 1812, the Republicans believed that the Federalists in New England were conspiring with the British who were forming alliances with the various Indian tribes while recruiting "late Loyalists" in Canada, to break up the union. Instead, the war served to alienate the Federalists who were ready to trade and even smuggle with the British rather than to fight them. By 1812, the Federalist Party had weakened considerably and the Republicans were in a strong position, with James Madison completing his first term of office and control of Congress.

Support for the American cause was weak in Federalist areas of the Northeast throughout the war as fewer men volunteered to serve and the banks avoided financing the war. The negativism of the Federalists ruined the party's reputation post-war, as exemplified by the Hartford Convention of 1814–1815, and the party survived only in scattered areas. By 1815, after the victory at the Battle of New Orleans, there was broad support for the war from all parts of the country. This allowed the triumphant Democratic-Republicans to adopt some Federalist policies, such as the national bank, which Madison re-established in 1816.

Forces

American 
During the years 1810–1812, American naval ships were divided into two major squadrons, with the "northern division", based at New York, commanded by Commodore John Rodgers, and the "southern division", based at Norfolk, commanded by Commodore Stephen Decatur.

Although not much of a threat to Canada in 1812, the United States Navy was a well-trained and professional force comprising over 5,000 sailors and marines. It had 14 ocean-going warships with three of its five "super-frigates" non-operational at the onset of the war. Its principal problem was lack of funding, as many in Congress did not see the need for a strong navy. The biggest ships in the American navy were frigates and there were no ships-of-the-line capable of engaging in a fleet action with the Royal Navy. On the high seas, the Americans pursued a strategy of commerce raiding, capturing or sinking British merchantmen with their frigates and privateers. The Navy was largely concentrated on the Atlantic coast before the war as it had only two gunboats on Lake Champlain, one brig on Lake Ontario and another brig in Lake Erie when the war began.

The United States Army was initially much larger than the British Army in North America. Many men carried their own long rifles while the British were issued muskets, except for one unit of 500 riflemen. Leadership was inconsistent in the American officer corps as some officers proved themselves to be outstanding, but many others were inept, owing their positions to political favours. Congress was hostile to a standing army and the government called out 450,000 men from the state militias during the war. The state militias were poorly trained, armed, and led. The failed invasion of Lake Champlain led by General Dearborn illustrates this. The British Army soundly defeated the Maryland and Virginia militias at the Battle of Bladensburg in 1814 and President Madison commented "I could never have believed so great a difference existed between regular troops and a militia force, if I had not witnessed the scenes of this day".

British 

The United States was only a secondary concern to Britain, so long as the war continued with France. In 1813, France had 80 ships-of-the-line and was building another 35. Containing the French fleet was the main British naval concern, leaving only the ships on the North American and Jamaica Stations immediately available. In Upper Canada, the British had the Provincial Marine. While largely unarmed, they were essential for keeping the army supplied since the roads were abysmal in Upper Canada. At the onset of war the Provincial Marine had four small armed vessels on Lake Ontario, three on Lake Erie and one on Lake Champlain. The Provincial Marine greatly outnumbered anything the Americans could bring to bear on the Great Lakes.

When the war broke out, the British Army in North America numbered 9,777 men in regular units and fencibles. While the British Army was engaged in the Peninsular War, few reinforcements were available. Although the British were outnumbered, the long-serving regulars and fencibles were better trained and more professional than the hastily expanded United States Army. The militias of Upper Canada and Lower Canada were initially far less effective, but substantial numbers of full-time militia were raised during the war and played pivotal roles in several engagements, including the Battle of the Chateauguay which caused the Americans to abandon the Saint Lawrence River theatre.

Indigenous peoples 
The highly decentralized bands and tribes considered themselves allies of, and not subordinates to, the British or the Americans. Various Indian tribes fighting with United States forces provided them with their "most effective light troops" while the British needed indigenous allies to compensate for their numerical inferiority. The indigenous allies of the British, Tecumseh's confederacy in the west and Iroquois in the east avoided pitched battles and relied on irregular warfare, including raids and ambushes that took advantage of their knowledge of terrain. In addition, they were highly mobile, able to march  a day. 

Their leaders sought to fight only under favourable conditions and would avoid any battle that promised heavy losses, doing what they thought best for their tribes, much to the annoyance of both American and British generals. The indigenous fighters saw no issue with withdrawing if needed to save casualties. They always sought to surround an enemy, where possible, to avoid being surrounded and make effective use of the terrain. Their main weapons were a mixture of muskets, rifles, bows, tomahawks, knives and swords as well as clubs and other melee weapons, which sometimes had the advantage of being quieter than guns.

Declaration of war 

On 1 June 1812, President James Madison sent a message to Congress recounting American grievances against Great Britain, though not specifically calling for a declaration of war. The House of Representatives then deliberated for four days behind closed doors before voting 79 to 49 (61%) in favour of the first declaration of war. The Senate concurred in the declaration by a 19 to 13 (59%) vote in favour. The declaration focused mostly on maritime issues, especially involving British blockades, with two thirds of the indictment devoted to such impositions, initiated by Britain's Orders in Council. The conflict began formally on 18 June 1812, when Madison signed the measure into law. He proclaimed it the next day. This was the first time that the United States had declared war on another nation and the Congressional vote was the closest vote in American history to formally declare war. None of the 39 Federalists in Congress voted in favour of the war, while other critics referred to it as "Mr. Madison's War". Just days after war had been declared, a small number of Federalists in Baltimore were attacked for printing anti-war views in a newspaper, which eventually led to over a month of deadly rioting in the city.

Prime Minister Spencer Perceval was assassinated in London on 11 May and Lord Liverpool came to power. He wanted a more practical relationship with the United States. On June 23, he issued a repeal of the Orders in Council, but the United States was unaware of this, as it took three weeks for the news to cross the Atlantic. On 28 June 1812,  was dispatched from Halifax to New York under a flag of truce. She anchored off Sandy Hook on July 9 and left three days later carrying a copy of the declaration of war, British ambassador to the United States Augustus Foster and consul Colonel Thomas Henry Barclay. She arrived in Halifax, Nova Scotia eight days later. The news of the declaration took even longer to reach London.

British commander Isaac Brock in Upper Canada received the news much faster. He issued a proclamation alerting citizens to the state of war and urging all military personnel "to be vigilant in the discharge of their duty", so as to prevent communication with the enemy and to arrest anyone suspected of helping the Americans. He also issued orders to the commander of the British post at Fort St. Joseph to initiate offensive operations against American forces in northern Michigan who were not yet aware of their own government's declaration of war. The resulting Siege of Fort Mackinac on 17 July was the first major land engagement of the war and ended in an easy British victory.

Course of war 

The war was conducted in three theatres:
 The Great Lakes and the Canadian frontier.
 At sea, principally the Atlantic Ocean and the American east coast.
 The Southern states and southwestern territories.

Unpreparedness 

The war had been preceded by years of diplomatic dispute, yet neither side was ready for war when it came. Britain was heavily engaged in the Napoleonic Wars, most of the British Army was deployed in the Peninsular War in Portugal and Spain, and the Royal Navy was blockading most of the coast of Europe. The number of British regular troops present in Canada in July 1812 was officially 6,034, supported by additional Canadian militia. Throughout the war, the British War Secretary was Earl Bathurst, who had few troops to spare for reinforcing North America defences during the first two years of the war. He urged Lieutenant General George Prévost to maintain a defensive strategy. Prévost, who had the trust of the Canadians, followed these instructions and concentrated on defending Lower Canada at the expense of Upper Canada, which was more vulnerable to American attacks and allowed few offensive actions. Unlike campaigns along the east coast, Prevost had to operate with no support from the Royal Navy.

The United States was also not prepared for war. Madison had assumed that the state militias would easily seize Canada and that negotiations would follow. In 1812, the regular army consisted of fewer than 12,000 men. Congress authorized the expansion of the army to 35,000 men, but the service was voluntary and unpopular; it paid poorly and there were initially few trained and experienced officers. The militia objected to serving outside their home states, they were undisciplined and performed poorly against British forces when called upon to fight in unfamiliar territory. Multiple militia refused orders to cross the border and fight on Canadian soil.

American prosecution of the war suffered from its unpopularity, especially in New England where anti-war speakers were vocal. Massachusetts Congressmen Ebenezer Seaver and William Widgery were "publicly insulted and hissed" in Boston while a mob seized Plymouth's Chief Justice Charles Turner on 3 August 1812 "and kicked [him] through the town". The United States had great difficulty financing its war. It had disbanded its national bank, and private bankers in the Northeast were opposed to the war, but it obtained financing from London-based Barings Bank to cover overseas bond obligations. New England failed to provide militia units or financial support, which was a serious blow, and New England states made loud threats to secede as evidenced by the Hartford Convention. Britain exploited these divisions, opting to not blockade the ports of New England for much of the war and encouraging smuggling.

War in the West

Invasions of Canada, 1812

An American army commanded by William Hull invaded Upper Canada on July 12, arriving at Sandwich (Windsor, Ontario) after crossing the Detroit River. His forces were chiefly composed of untrained and ill-disciplined militiamen. Hull issued a proclamation ordering all British subjects to surrender, or "the horrors, and calamities of war will stalk before you". The proclamation said that Hull wanted to free them from the "tyranny" of Great Britain, giving them the liberty, security, and wealth that his own country enjoyed—unless they preferred "war, slavery and destruction". He also threatened to kill any British soldier caught fighting alongside indigenous fighters. Hull's proclamation only helped to stiffen resistance to the American attacks as he lacked artillery and supplies. Hull also had to fight just to maintain his own lines of communication.

Hull withdrew to the American side of the river on 7 August 1812 after receiving news of a Shawnee ambush on Major Thomas Van Horne's 200 men, who had been sent to support the American supply convoy. Half of Horne's troops had been killed. Hull had also faced a lack of support from his officers and fear among his troops of a possible massacre by unfriendly indigenous forces. A group of 600 troops led by Lieutenant Colonel James Miller remained in Canada, attempting to supply the American position in the Sandwich area, with little success.

Major General Isaac Brock believed that he should take bold measures to calm the settler population in Canada and to convince the tribes that Britain was strong. He moved to Amherstburg near the western end of Lake Erie with reinforcements and attacked Detroit, using Fort Malden as his stronghold. Hull feared that the British possessed superior numbers; also Fort Detroit lacked adequate gunpowder and cannonballs to withstand a long siege. He agreed to surrender on 16 August, saving his 2,500 soldiers and 700 civilians from "the horrors of an Indian massacre", as he wrote. Hull also ordered the evacuation of Fort Dearborn (Chicago) to Fort Wayne, but Potawatomi warriors ambushed them, escorted them back to the fort where they were massacred on 15 August after they had travelled only . The fort was subsequently burned.

Brock moved to the eastern end of Lake Erie, where American General Stephen Van Rensselaer was attempting a second invasion. The Americans attempted an attack across the Niagara River on 13 October, but they were defeated at Queenston Heights. However, Brock was killed during the battle and British leadership suffered after his death. American General Henry Dearborn made a final attempt to advance north from Lake Champlain, but his militia refused to go beyond American territory.

American Northwest, 1813 

After Hull surrendered Detroit, General William Henry Harrison took command of the American Army of the Northwest. He set out to retake the city, which was now defended by Colonel Henry Procter and Tecumseh. A detachment of Harrison's army was defeated at Frenchtown along the River Raisin on 22 January 1813. Procter left the prisoners with an inadequate guard and his Potawatomie allies killed and scalped 60 captive Americans. The defeat ended Harrison's campaign against Detroit, but "Remember the River Raisin!" became a rallying cry for the Americans.

In May 1813, Procter and Tecumseh set siege to Fort Meigs in northwestern Ohio. Tecumseh's fighters ambushed American reinforcements who arrived during the siege, but the fort held out. The fighters eventually began to disperse, forcing Procter and Tecumseh to return to Canada. Along the way they attempted to storm Fort Stephenson, a small American post on the Sandusky River near Lake Erie. They were repulsed with serious losses, marking the end of the Ohio campaign.

Captain Oliver Hazard Perry fought the Battle of Lake Erie on 10 September 1813. His decisive victory at Put-in-Bay ensured American military control of the lake, improved American morale after a series of defeats and compelled the British to fall back from Detroit. This enabled General Harrison to launch another invasion of Upper Canada, which culminated in the American victory at the Battle of the Thames on 5 October 1813, where Tecumseh was killed.

American West, 1813–1815 
The Mississippi River valley was the western frontier of the United States in 1812. The territory acquired in the Louisiana Purchase of 1803 contained almost no American settlements west of the Mississippi except around St. Louis and a few forts and trading posts in the Boonslick. Fort Belle Fontaine was an old trading post converted to an Army post in 1804 and this served as regional headquarters. Fort Osage, built in 1808 along the Missouri River, was the westernmost American outpost, but it was abandoned at the start of the war. Fort Madison was built along the Mississippi in Iowa in 1808 and had been repeatedly attacked by British-allied Sauk since its construction. The United States Army abandoned Fort Madison in September 1813 after the indigenous fighters attacked it and besieged it—with support from the British. This was one of the few battles fought west of the Mississippi. Black Hawk played a leadership role.

The American victory on Lake Erie and the recapture of Detroit isolated the British on Lake Huron. In the winter a Canadian party under Lieutenant Colonel Robert McDouall established a new supply line from York to Nottawasaga Bay on Georgian Bay. He arrived at Fort Mackinac on 18 May with supplies and more than 400 militia and Indians, then sent an expedition which successfully besieged and recaptured the key trading post of Prairie du Chien, on the Upper Mississippi. The Americans dispatched a substantial expedition to relieve the fort, but Sauk, Fox, and Kickapoo warriors under Black Hawk ambushed it and forced it to withdraw with heavy losses in the Battle of Rock Island Rapids. In September 1814, the Sauk, Fox, and Kickapoo, supported by part of Prairie du Chien's British garrison, repulsed a second American force led by Major Zachary Taylor in the Battle of Credit Island. These victories enabled the Sauk, Fox, and Kickapoo to harass American garrisons further to the south, which led the Americans to abandon Fort Johnson, in central Illinois Territory. Consequently, the Americans lost control of almost all of Illinois Territory, although they held onto the St. Louis area and eastern Missouri. However, the Sauk raided even into these territories, clashing with American forces at the Battle of Cote Sans Dessein in April 1815 at the mouth of the Osage River in the Missouri Territory and the Battle of the Sink Hole in May 1815 near Fort Cap au Gris. This left the British and their Indian allies in control of most of modern Illinois and all of modern Wisconsin.

Meanwhile, the British were supplying the Indians in the Old Northwest from Montreal via Mackinac. On 3 July, the Americans sent a force of five vessels from Detroit to recapture Mackinac. A mixed force of regulars and volunteers from the militia landed on the island on 4 August. They did not attempt to achieve surprise, and Indians ambushed them in the brief Battle of Mackinac Island and forced them to re-embark. The Americans discovered the new base at Nottawasaga Bay and on 13 August they destroyed its fortifications and the schooner Nancy that they found there. They then returned to Detroit, leaving two gunboats to blockade Mackinac. On 4 September, the gunboats were taken unawares and captured by British boarding parties from canoes and small boats. These engagements on Lake Huron left Mackinac under British control.

The British returned Mackinac and other captured territory to the United States after the war. Some British officers and Canadians objected to handing back Prairie du Chien and especially Mackinac under the terms of the Treaty of Ghent. However, the Americans retained the captured post at Fort Malden near Amherstburg until the British complied with the treaty. Fighting between Americans, the Sauk and other indigenous tribes continued through 1817, well after the war ended in the east.

War in the American Northeast

Niagara frontier, 1813 

Both sides placed great importance on gaining control of the Great Lakes and the St. Lawrence River because of the difficulties of land-based communication. The British already had a small squadron of warships on Lake Ontario when the war began and had the initial advantage. The Americans established a Navy yard at Sackett's Harbor, New York, a port on Lake Ontario. Commodore Isaac Chauncey took charge of the thousands of sailors and shipwrights assigned there and recruited more from New York. They completed a warship (the corvette USS Madison) in 45 days. Ultimately, almost 3,000 men at the shipyard built 11 warships and many smaller boats and transports. Army forces were also stationed at Sackett's Harbor, where they camped out through the town, far surpassing the small population of 900. Officers were housed with families. Madison Barracks was later built at Sackett's Harbor.

Having regained the advantage by their rapid building program, on 27 April 1813 Chauncey and Dearborn attacked York, the capital of Upper Canada. At the Battle of York, the outnumbered British regulars destroyed the fort and dockyard and retreated, leaving the militia to surrender the town. American soldiers set fire to the Legislature building, and looted and vandalized several government buildings and citizens' homes.

On 25 May 1813, Fort Niagara and the American Lake Ontario squadron began bombarding Fort George. An American amphibious force assaulted Fort George on the northern end of the Niagara River on 27 May and captured it without serious losses. The British abandoned Fort Erie and headed towards Burlington Heights. The British position was close to collapsing in Upper Canada; the Iroquois considered changing sides and ignored a British appeal to come to their aid. However, the Americans did not pursue the retreating British forces until they had largely escaped and organized a counter-offensive at the Battle of Stoney Creek on 5 June. The British launched a surprise attack at 2 a.m., leading to confused fighting and a strategic British victory.

The Americans pulled back to Forty Mile Creek rather than continue their advance into Upper Canada. At this point, the Six Nations of the Grand River began to come out to fight for the British as an American victory no longer seemed inevitable. The Iroquois ambushed an American patrol at Forty Mile Creek while the Royal Navy squadron based in Kingston sailed in and bombarded the American camp. General Dearborn retreated to Fort George, mistakenly believing that he was outnumbered and outgunned. British Brigadier General John Vincent was encouraged when about 800 Iroquois arrived to assist him.

An American force surrendered on 24 June to a smaller British force due to advance warning by Laura Secord at the Battle of Beaver Dams, marking the end of the American offensive into Upper Canada. British Major General Francis de Rottenburg did not have the strength to retake Fort George, so he instituted a blockade, hoping to starve the Americans into surrender. Meanwhile, Commodore James Lucas Yeo had taken charge of the British ships on the lake and mounted a counterattack, which the Americans repulsed at the Battle of Sackett's Harbor. Thereafter, Chauncey and Yeo's squadrons fought two indecisive actions, off the Niagara on 7 August and at Burlington Bay on 28 September. Neither commander was prepared to take major risks to gain a complete victory.

Late in 1813, the Americans abandoned the Canadian territory that they occupied around Fort George. They set fire to the village of Newark (now Niagara-on-the-Lake) on 10 December 1813, incensing the Canadians. Many of the inhabitants were left without shelter, freezing to death in the snow. The British retaliated following their Capture of Fort Niagara on 18 December 1813. A British-Indian force led by Riall stormed the neighbouring town of Lewiston, New York on 19 December; four American civilians were killed by drunken Indians after the battle. A small force of Tuscarora warriors engaged Riall's men during the battle, which allowed many residents of Lewiston to evacuate the village. The British and their Indian allies subsequently attacked and burned Buffalo on Lake Erie on 30 December 1813 in revenge for the American attack on Fort George and Newark in May.

St. Lawrence and Lower Canada, 1813 
The British were vulnerable along the stretch of the St. Lawrence that was between Upper Canada and the United States. In the winter of 1812–1813, the Americans launched a series of raids from Ogdensburg, New York that hampered British supply traffic up the river. On 21 February, George Prévost passed through Prescott, Ontario on the opposite bank of the river with reinforcements for Upper Canada. When he left the next day, the reinforcements and local militia attacked in the Battle of Ogdensburg and the Americans were forced to retreat.

The Americans made two more thrusts against Montreal in 1813. Major General Wade Hampton was to march north from Lake Champlain and join a force under General James Wilkinson that would sail from Sackett's Harbor on Lake Ontario and descend the St. Lawrence. Hampton was delayed by road and supply problems and his intense dislike of Wilkinson limited his desire to support his plan. Charles de Salaberry defeated Hampton's force of 4,000 at the Chateauguay River on 25 October with a smaller force of Canadian Voltigeurs and Mohawks. Salaberry's force numbered only 339, but it had a strong defensive position. Wilkinson's force of 8,000 set out on 17 October, but it was delayed by weather. Wilkinson heard that a British force was pursuing him under Captain William Mulcaster and Lieutenant Colonel Joseph Wanton Morrison and landed near Morrisburg, Ontario by 10 November, about 150 kilometres (90 mi) from Montreal. On 11 November, his rear guard of 2,500 attacked Morrison's force of 800 at Crysler's Farm and was repulsed with heavy losses. He learned that Hampton could not renew his advance, retreated to the United States and settled into winter quarters. He resigned his command after a failed attack on a British outpost at Lacolle Mills.

Niagara and Plattsburgh campaigns, 1814 

The Americans again invaded the Niagara frontier. They had occupied southwestern Upper Canada after they defeated Colonel Henry Procter at Moraviantown in October and believed that taking the rest of the province would force the British to cede it to them. The end of the war with Napoleon in Europe in April 1814 meant that the British could deploy their army to North America, so the Americans wanted to secure Upper Canada to negotiate from a position of strength. They planned to invade via the Niagara frontier while sending another force to recapture Mackinac. They captured Fort Erie on 3 July 1814. Unaware of Fort Erie's fall or of the size of the American force, the British general Phineas Riall engaged with Winfield Scott, who won against a British force at the Battle of Chippawa on 5 July. The American forces had been through a hard training under Winfield Scott and proved to the professionals under fire. They would deploy in a shallow U formation bringing flanking fire and well-aimed volleys against Riall's men. Riall's men were chased off the battlefield.

An attempt to advance further ended with the hard-fought but inconclusive Battle of Lundy's Lane on July 25. The battle was fought several miles north of Chippewa River near Niagara Falls and is considered the bloodiest and costliest battle of the war. Both sides stood their ground as American General Jacob Brown pulled back to Fort George after the battle and the British did not pursue. Commanders Riall, Scott, Brown, and Drummond were all wounded; Scott's wounds ended his commission for the rest of the war.

The Americans withdrew but withstood a prolonged siege of Fort Erie. The British tried to storm Fort Erie on 14 August 1814, but they suffered heavy losses, losing 950 killed, wounded and captured compared to only 84 dead and wounded on the American side. The British were further weakened by exposure and shortage of supplies. Eventually, they raised the siege, but American Major General George Izard took over command on the Niagara front and followed up only halfheartedly. An American raid along the Grand River destroyed many farms and weakened British logistics. In October 1814, the Americans advanced into Upper Canada and engaged in skirmishes at Cook's Mill, but they pulled back when they heard that the new British warship , launched in Kingston that September, was on its way, armed with 104 guns. The Americans lacked provisions and retreated across the Niagara after destroying Fort Erie.

Meanwhile, 15,000 British troops were sent to North America under four of Wellington's ablest brigade commanders after Napoleon abdicated. Fewer than half were veterans of the Peninsula and the rest came from garrisons. Prévost was ordered to neutralize American power on the lakes by burning Sackett's Harbor to gain naval control of Lake Erie, Lake Ontario, and the Upper Lakes as well as to defend Lower Canada from attack. He did defend Lower Canada but otherwise failed to achieve his objectives, so he decided to invade New York State. His army outnumbered the American defenders of Plattsburgh, but he was worried about his flanks and decided that he needed naval control of Lake Champlain. Upon reaching Plattsburgh, Prévost delayed the assault until Downie arrived in the hastily completed 36-gun frigate . Despite the Confiance not being fully completed, she had a raw crew that had never worked together. Prévost forced Downie into a premature attack when there was no reason for the rush.

The British squadron on the lake under Captain George Downie was more evenly matched by the Americans under Master Commandant Thomas Macdonough. At the Battle of Plattsburgh on 11 September 1814, the British had the advantage of larger vessels and guns; the American gunboats were more suited to engagements on Lake Champlain, while MacDonough was able to manoeuvre his ships using pulley lines attached to anchors. Early in the battle each side lost a ship; Downie was killed by the recoil of a loose gun carriage while MacDonough was twice knocked down and dazed. After two and a half hours HMS Confiance suffered heavy casualties and struck her colours and the rest of the British fleet retreated. Prevost, already alienated from his veteran officers by insisting on proper dress codes, now lost their confidence, while MacDonough emerged as a national hero.

The Americans now had control of Lake Champlain; Theodore Roosevelt later termed it "the greatest naval battle of the war". General Alexander Macomb led the successful land defence. Prévost then turned back, to the astonishment of his senior officers, saying that it was too hazardous to remain on enemy territory after the loss of naval supremacy. He was recalled to London, where a naval court-martial decided that defeat had been caused principally by Prévost urging the squadron into premature action and then failing to afford the promised support from the land forces. He died suddenly, just before his court-martial was to convene. His reputation sank to a new low as Canadians claimed that their militia under Brock did the job but Prévost failed. However, recent historians have been kinder. Peter Burroughs argues that his preparations were energetic, well-conceived, and comprehensive for defending the Canadas with limited means and that he achieved the primary objective of preventing an American conquest.

Occupation of Maine 

Maine, then part of Massachusetts, was a base for smuggling and illegal trade between the United States and the British. Until 1813, the region was generally quiet except for privateer actions near the coast.

On 11 July 1814, Thomas Masterman Hardy took Moose Island (Eastport, Maine) without a shot and the entire American garrison, 65 men of Fort Sullivan peacefully surrendered. The British temporarily renamed the captured fort "Fort Sherbrooke". In September 1814, John Coape Sherbrooke led 3,000 British troops from his base in Halifax, Nova Scotia in the "Penobscot Expedition". In 26 days, he raided and looted Hampden, Bangor and Machias, destroying or capturing 17 American ships. He won the Battle of Hampden, with two killed while the Americans had one killed. Retreating American forces were forced to destroy the frigate .

The British occupied the town of Castine and most of eastern Maine for the rest of the war, governing it under martial law and re-establishing the colony of New Ireland. The Treaty of Ghent returned this territory to the United States. When the British left in April 1815, they took £10,750 in tariff duties from Castine. This money, called the "Castine Fund", was used to establish Dalhousie University in Halifax. Decisions about the islands in Passamaquoddy Bay were decided by joint commission in 1817. However, Machias Seal Island had been seized by the British as part of the occupation and was unaddressed by the commission. While kept by Britain/Canada, it remains in dispute to this day.

Chesapeake campaign 

The strategic location of the Chesapeake Bay near the Potomac River made it a prime target for the British. Rear Admiral George Cockburn arrived there in March 1813 and was joined by Admiral Warren who took command of operations ten days later. Starting in March a squadron under Rear Admiral George Cockburn started a blockade of the mouth of the Bay at Hampton Roads harbour and raided towns along the Bay from Norfolk, Virginia to Havre de Grace, Maryland. In late April Cockburn landed at and set fire to Frenchtown, Maryland and destroyed ships that were docked there. In the following weeks he routed the local militias and looted and burned three other towns. Thereafter he marched to iron foundry at Principio and destroyed it along with sixty-eight cannons.

On 4 July 1813, Commodore Joshua Barney, an American Revolutionary War naval officer, convinced the Navy Department to build the Chesapeake Bay Flotilla, a squadron of twenty barges powered by small sails or oars (sweeps) to defend the Chesapeake Bay. Launched in April 1814, the squadron was quickly cornered on the Patuxent River. While successful in harassing the Royal Navy, they could not stop subsequent British operations in the area.

Burning of Washington 
In August 1814, a force of 2,500 soldiers under General Ross had just arrived in Bermuda aboard , three frigates, three sloops and ten other vessels. Released from the Peninsular War by victory, the British intended to use them for diversionary raids along the coasts of Maryland and Virginia. In response to Prévost's request, they decided to employ this force, together with the naval and military units already on the station, to strike at the national capital. Anticipating the attack, valuable documents, including the original Constitution, were removed to Leesburg, Virginia.

United States Secretary of War John Armstrong Jr. insisted that the British were going to attack Baltimore rather than Washington, even as British army and naval units were on their way to Washington. Brigadier General William H. Winder, who had burned several bridges in the area, assumed the British would attack Annapolis and was reluctant to engage because he mistakenly thought the British army was twice its size. The inexperienced state militia was easily routed in the Battle of Bladensburg, opening the route to Washington. British troops led by Major General Robert Ross, accompanied by Rear Admiral George Cockburn, the 3rd Brigade attacked and captured Washington with a force of 4,500. On 24 August, after the British had finished looting the interiors, Ross directed his troops to set fire to number of public buildings, including the White House and the United States Capitol. Extensive damage to the interiors and the contents of both were subsequently reported. US government and military officials fled to Virginia, while Secretary of the United States Navy William Jones ordered the Washington Navy Yard and a nearby fort to be razed in order to prevent its capture. Public buildings in Washington were destroyed by the British though private residences ordered spared.

Siege of Fort McHenry 

After taking some munitions from the Washington Munitions depot, the British, boarded their ships and moved on to their major target, the heavily fortified major city of Baltimore. Because some of their ships were held up in the Raid on Alexandria, they delayed their movement allowing Baltimore an opportunity to strengthen the fortifications and bring in new federal troops and state militia units. The "Battle for Baltimore" began with the British landing on 12 September 1814 at North Point, where they were met by American militia further up the Patapsco Neck peninsula. An exchange of fire began, with casualties on both sides. The British Army commander Major Gen. Robert Ross was killed by snipers. The British paused, then continued to march northwestward to face the stationed Maryland and Baltimore City militia units at Godly Wood. The Battle of North Point was fought for several afternoon hours in a musketry and artillery duel. The British also planned to simultaneously attack Baltimore by water on the following day, although the Royal Navy was unable to reduce Fort McHenry at the entrance to Baltimore Harbor in support of an attack from the northeast by the British Army.

The British eventually realized that they could not force the passage to attack Baltimore in coordination with the land force. A last ditch night feint and barge attack during a heavy rain storm was led by Captain Charles Napier around the fort up the Middle Branch of the river to the west. Split and misdirected partly in the storm, it turned back after suffering heavy casualties from the alert gunners of Fort Covington and Battery Babcock. The British called off the attack and sailed downriver to pick up their army, which had retreated from the east side of Baltimore. All the lights were extinguished in Baltimore the night of the attack, and the fort was bombarded for 25 hours. The only light was given off by the exploding shells over Fort McHenry, illuminating the flag that was still flying over the fort. The defence of the fort inspired the American lawyer Francis Scott Key to write "Defence of Fort M'Henry", a poem that was later set to music as "The Star-Spangled Banner".

Southern theatre 
Because of the region's polyglot population, both the British and the Americans perceived the war in the Gulf South as a fundamentally different conflict from the one occurring in the Lowcountry and Chesapeake.

Creek War 

Before 1813, the war between the Creeks, or Muscogee, had been largely an internal affair sparked by the ideas of Tecumseh farther north in the Mississippi Valley. A faction known as the Red Sticks, so named for the colour of their war sticks, had broken away from the rest of the Creek Confederacy, which wanted peace with the United States. The Red Sticks were allied with Tecumseh, who had visited the Creeks about a year before 1813 and encouraged greater resistance to the Americans. The Creek Nation was a trading partner of the United States, actively involved with British and Spanish trade as well. The Red Sticks as well as many southern Muscogee people like the Seminole had a long history of alliance with the British and Spanish empires. This alliance helped the North American and European powers protect each other's claims to territory in the south.

On 27 July the Red Sticks were returning from Pensacola with a pack train filled with trade goods and arms when they were attacked by Americans who made off with their goods. On 30 August 1813, in retaliation for the raid, the Red Sticks, led by chiefs of the Creeks Red Eagle and Peter McQueen, attacked Fort Mims north of Mobile, the only American-held port in the territory of West Florida. The attack on Fort Mims resulted in the horrific death of 400 refugee settlers, all butchered and scalped, including women and children, and became an ideological rallying point for the Americans. It prompted the state of Georgia and the Mississippi militia to immediately take major action against Creek offensives. The Red Sticks chiefs gained power in the east along the Alabama River, Coosa River and Tallapoosa River in the Upper Creek territory. By contrast, the Lower Creek, who lived along the Chattahoochee River, generally opposed the Red Sticks and wanted to remain allied to the U.S. Indian agent Benjamin Hawkins recruited Lower Creek to aid the 6th Military District under General Thomas Pinckney and the state militias against the Red Sticks. The United States combined forces were 5,000 troops from East and West Tennessee, with about 200 indigenous allies. At its peak, the Red Stick faction had 4,000 warriors, only a quarter of whom had muskets.

The Indian frontier of western Georgia was the most vulnerable but was partially fortified already. From November 1813 to January 1814, Georgia's militia and auxiliary Federal troops from the Creek and Cherokee indigenous nations and the states of North Carolina and South Carolina organized the fortification of defences along the Chattahoochee River and expeditions into Upper Creek territory in present-day Alabama. The army, led by General John Floyd, went to the heart of the Creek Holy Grounds and won a major offensive against one of the largest Creek towns at the Battle of Autossee, killing an estimated two hundred people. In November, the militia of Mississippi with a combined 1,200 troops attacked the Econachca encampment in the Battle of Holy Ground on the Alabama River. Tennessee raised a militia of 5,000 under Major General Andrew Jackson and Brigadier General John Coffee and won the battles of Tallushatchee and Talladega in November 1813.

Jackson suffered enlistment problems in the winter. He decided to combine his force, composed of Tennessee militia and pro-American Creek, with the Georgia militia. In January, however, the Red Sticks attacked his army at the Battles of Emuckfaw and Enotachopo Creek. Jackson's troops repelled the attackers, but they were outnumbered and forced to withdraw to his base at Fort Strother.

In January, Floyd's force of 1,300 state militia and 400 Creek moved to join the United States forces in Tennessee, but they were attacked in camp on the Calibee Creek by Tukabatchee Muscogees on 27 January.

Jackson's force increased in numbers with the arrival of United States Army soldiers and a second draft of Tennessee state militia, Cherokee, and pro-American Creek swelled his army to around 5,000. In March 1814, they moved south to attack the Red Sticks. On 27 March, Jackson decisively defeated a force of about a thousand Red Sticks at Horseshoe Bend, killing 800 of them at a cost of 49 killed and 154 wounded. 

Jackson then moved his army to Fort Jackson on the Alabama River. He promptly turned on the pro-American Creek who had fought with him and compelled their chieftains, along with a single Red Stick chieftain, to sign the Treaty of Fort Jackson, which forced the Creek tribe as a whole to cede most of western Georgia and part of Alabama to the U.S. Both Hawkins and the pro-American Creek strongly opposed the treaty, which they regarded as deeply unjust. The treaty also demanded that the Creek cease communicating with the British and Spanish and trade only with United States-approved agents.

British aid to the Red Sticks arrived after the end of the Napoleonic Wars in April 1814 and after Admiral Alexander Cochrane assumed command from Admiral Warren in March. Captain Hugh Pigot arrived with two ships to arm the Red Sticks. He thought that some 6,600 warriors could be armed and recruited. It was overly optimistic at best. The Red Sticks were in the process of being destroyed as a military force. In April 1814, the British established an outpost on the Apalachicola River (Prospect Bluff Historic Sites). In addition to training them, Nicolls was tasked to raise a force from escaped slaves as part of the Corps of Colonial Marines.

In July 1814, General Jackson complained to the governor of Pensacola, Mateo González Manrique that combatants from the Creek War were being harboured in Spanish territory and made reference to the British presence on Spanish soil. Although he gave an angry reply to Jackson, Manrique was alarmed at the weak position he found himself in and appealed to the British for help. Woodbine arrived on 28 July and Nicolls on 24 August.

The first engagement of the British and their Creek allies against the Americans on the Gulf Coast was the 14 September 1814 attack on Fort Bowyer. Captain William Percy tried to take the United States fort, hoping to then move on Mobile and block United States trade and encroachment on the Mississippi. After the Americans repulsed Percy's forces, the British established a military presence of up to 200 Marines at Pensacola. In November, Jackson's force of 4,000 men took the town. This underlined the superiority of numbers of Jackson's force in the region. The United States force moved to New Orleans in late 1814. Jackson's army of 1,000 regulars and 3,000 to 4,000 militia, pirates and other fighters as well as civilians and slaves built fortifications south of the city.

Gulf Coast
American forces under General James Wilkinson, himself a paid Spanish secret agent, took the Mobile area from the Spanish in March 1813. This region was the rump of Spanish West Florida, the western portion of which had been annexed to the United States in 1810. The Americans built Fort Bowyer, a log and earthen-work fort with 14 guns, on Mobile Point to defend it. Major Latour opined that none of the three forts in the area were capable of resisting a siege.

At the end of 1814, the British launched a double offensive in the South weeks before the Treaty of Ghent was signed. On the Atlantic coast, Admiral George Cockburn was to close the Intracoastal Waterway trade and land Royal Marine battalions to advance through Georgia to the western territories. While on the Gulf coast, Admiral Alexander Cochrane moved on the new state of Louisiana and the Mississippi Territory. Admiral Cochrane's ships reached the Louisiana coast on 9 December and Cockburn arrived in Georgia on 14 December.

The British had the objective of gaining control of the entrance of the Mississippi, and to challenge the legality of the Louisiana Purchase. To this end, an expeditionary force of 8,000 troops under General Edward Pakenham attacked Jackson's prepared defences in New Orleans on 8 January 1815. The Battle of New Orleans was an American victory, as the British failed to take the fortifications on the East Bank. The British attack force suffered high casualties, including 291 dead, 1,262 wounded and 484 captured or missing whereas American casualties were light with 13 dead, 39 wounded and 19 missing, according to the respective official casualty returns. This battle was hailed as a great victory across the United States, making Jackson a national hero and eventually propelling him to the presidency. In January 1815 Fort St. Philip endured ten days of bombardment from two bomb vessels of the Royal Navy. Remini believes this was preventing the British moving their fleet up the Mississippi in support of the land attack. Roosevelt does not share Remini's theory. He observes that the British disengaged once the fort's mortar was resupplied and was able to return fire on 17 January 1815, the engagement being described as 'unsuccessfully bombarding' the fort by the British.

After deciding further attacks would be too costly and unlikely to succeed; the British fleet withdrew from the Mississippi River on 18 January. However, it was not until 27 January 1815 that the land forces rejoined the fleet, allowing for its final departure. After New Orleans, the British moved to take Mobile as a base for further operations. In preparation, General John Lambert laid siege to Fort Bowyer taking it on 12 February 1815. However HMS Brazen brought news of the Treaty of Ghent the next day and the British abandoned the Gulf Coast. This ending of the war prevented the capture of Mobile, and any renewed attacks on New Orleans.

Meanwhile, in January 1815, Admiral Cockburn succeeded in blockading the southeastern coast of Georgia by occupying Camden County. The British quickly took Cumberland Island, Fort Point Peter and Fort St. Tammany in a decisive victory. Under the orders of his commanding officers, Cockburn's forces relocated many refugee slaves, capturing St. Simons Island as well to do so. He had orders to recruit as many runaway slaves into the Corps of Colonial Marines as possible and use them to conduct raids in Georgia and the Carolinas. Cockburn also provided thousands of muskets and carbines and a huge quantity of ammunition to the Creeks and Seminole Indians for the same purpose. During the invasion of the Georgia coast, an estimated 1,485 people chose to relocate to British territories or join the British military. 
However, by mid-March, several days after being informed of the Treaty of Ghent, British ships left the area.

The British did not recognize the West Florida territory as being legally American, as it had been seized from the Spanish during the war. The British also did not recognize the Louisiana Purchase because they and Spain voided all land deals and treaties made by Napoleon, especially the 1800–1804 transfer of Louisiana from Spain to France to the United States. Owsley is of the opinion this appeared to be compelling evidence that Britain had no intention of returning the region, had it completed capture of the territory, without new American concessions, referencing a letter from Thomas Shields to Daniel Patterson, dated January 25, 1815. This is contradicted by the content of Bathurst's correspondence, and disputed by Latimer, with specific reference to correspondence from the Prime Minister to the Foreign Secretary dated 23 December 1814. West Florida was the only territory permanently gained by the United States during the war.

The war at sea

Background
In 1812, Britain's Royal Navy was the world's largest and most powerful navy, with over 600 vessels in commission, following the defeat of the French Navy at the Battle of Trafalgar in 1805. Most of these ships were employed blockading the French navy and protecting British trade against French privateers, but the Royal Navy still had 85 vessels in American waters, counting all North American and Caribbean waters. However, the Royal Navy's North American squadron was the most immediately available force, based in Halifax, Nova Scotia and Bermuda, and numbered one small ship of the line and seven frigates as well as nine smaller sloops and brigs and five schooners. By contrast, the entire United States Navy was composed of 8 frigates, 14 smaller sloops and brigs, with no ships of the line. The United States had embarked on a major shipbuilding program before the war at Sackett's Harbor, New York to provide ships for use on the Great Lakes, and continued to produce new ships.

Opening strategies 
The British strategy was to protect their own merchant shipping between Halifax and the West Indies, with the order given on 13 October 1812 to enforce a blockade of major American ports to restrict American trade. 
Because of their numerical inferiority, the American strategy was to cause disruption through hit-and-run tactics such as the capturing prizes and engaging Royal Navy vessels only under favourable circumstances.

These were initially concentrated as one unit under Rodgers, who intended to force the Royal Navy to concentrate its own ships to prevent isolated units being captured by his powerful force. Large numbers of American merchant ships were returning to the United States with the outbreak of war and the Royal Navy could not watch all the ports on the American seaboard if they were concentrated together. Rodgers' strategy worked in that the Royal Navy concentrated most of its frigates off New York Harbor under Captain Philip Broke, allowing many American ships to reach home. However, Rodgers' own cruise captured only five small merchant ships, and the Americans never subsequently concentrated more than two or three ships together as a unit.

Single-ship actions 
The more recently built frigates of the US Navy were intended to overmatch their opponents. The United States of America did not believe that it could build a large enough navy to contest with the Royal Navy in fleet actions. As such where it could be done, individual ships were built to be tougher, larger, and carry more firepower, than the equivalent in European navies. With this in mind the newest three 44-gun ships were designed with a 24-pounder main battery. These frigates were intended to demolish the 36 to 38 gun (18-pounder) armed frigates that were by far the majority of the world's navies, while being able to evade larger ships. Similarly the Wasp class ship-sloops were an over-match to the Cruizer class brigs being employed by the British. The Royal Navy maintaining more than 600 ships, in fleets and stations worldwide, was overstretched and undermanned; a further consequence of this was that most British ships enforcing the blockade were (with a few notable exceptions) less practiced and drilled with their guns than the crews of the smaller US Navy. This meant that in single-ship actions the Royal Navy ships often found themselves against larger ships with larger crews, who were better drilled, as intended by the US planners.

However naval ships do not fight as individuals by the code of the duel, they are national instruments of war, and are used as such. The Royal Navy counted on its numbers, experience, and traditions to overcome the individually superior vessels. As the US Navy found itself mostly blockaded by the end of the war, the Royal Navy was correct. For all the fame that these actions received, they in no way affected the outcome of the results of Atlantic theatre of War. The final count of frigates lost was three on each side, with most of the US Navy blockaded in port. During the war, the United States Navy captured 165 British merchantmen (although privateers captured many more) while the Royal Navy captured 1,400 American merchantmen. More significantly, the British blockade of the Atlantic coast caused the majority of warships to be unable to put to sea and shut down both American imports and exports.

USS Constitution vs HMS Guerriere 19 August 1812, 2 p.m. 750 miles east of Boston the USS Constitution sighted HMS Guerriere. After manoeuvring for advantage both ships were at broadsides at a range of 75 yards at 6:00pm. The first exchange of broadsides was delivered at 6:05pm. The result was very one-sided. Guerriere had lost her mizzenmast, mainyard, and many of her gun crews. With Guerrieres mizzenmast in the water the ship was hard to manoeuvre. The return fire from Guerriere was far less successful. Two royal halyards fell and Constitutions heavy scantlings and planking shrugged off the Guerrieres fire. A failed boarding attempt was made by Guerriere and she swung helplessly into the wind as Constitution luffed by her bow raining down musket fire on her quarterdeck then raking her with a port broadside. Completely de-masted by Constitutions fire the Guerriere surrendered.

USS United States vs HMS Macedonian On 25 October, the USS United States commanded by Commodore Decatur captured the British frigate HMS Macedonian. Macedonian was faster, and the USS United States was a notoriously slow vessel and Macedonians captain John S. Carden used this to keep the weather gage. Decatur hove round to two points off the wind, forcing Macedonian into a stern chase on a parallel course to maintain contact. This was a deliberate tactic, as it allowed for the superior range of United States 24-pounder guns. Macedonian closed the distance slowly. At 9 a.m. both ships fired long-range broadsides to no effect. At 9:20 a.m. United States opened fire again. This time Macedonian lost several carronades, her mizzen topmast, and her driver gaff. With this damage Macedonian had lost her sailing advantage. Decatur used this fact to take up a raking fire from Macedonians quarter. The results were horrific; cannonballs were flying through both sides of Macedonian, and the crew was slaughtered. Captain Carden felt that he had to surrender.

USS Constitution vs HMS Java (1811) On 29 December at 9 a.m., at sea off Bahia, Brazil. in search of prizes, Constitution sighted unknown sails on the distant horizon. Captain Bainbridge was initially unsure of the type and nationality of the ships, but hours later as they drew closer he was able to discern that the approaching vessels were large, and now assumed them to be British. Constitution hoisted the US private signal at 11:30 a.m., while the presumed British vessel, the frigate , also hoisted its signals, but neither ship made the correct counter-signal. Constitution, tacking the wind, made her way from the neutral Portuguese territorial waters with Java giving chase.

The following day at 12:30 p.m. Java hoisted her colours and ensign with Constitution hoisting her colours in reply. With the affiliations of each ship now confirmed, Java, with the weather gauge to her advantage, came about to position herself to rake Constitution. Being French-built, she was comparatively light for a frigate and was consequently faster and more manoeuvrable. In reply Constitution fired a shot across Javas bow with Java returning fire with a full broadside. The opening phase of the action comprised both ships turning to and fro, attempting to get the better position for which to fire upon and rake the other, but with little success. Bainbridge now wore Constitution to a matching course and opened fire with a broadside at half a mile. This broadside accomplished nothing and forced Bainbridge to risk being raked in order to get closer to Java.

As the battle progressed a broadside from Java carried away Constitutions helm, disabling her rudder and leaving Bainbridge severely wounded; however he retained command, refusing to sit out the battle. Both ships continued firing broadsides but by now Java had a mast and sail falling over her starboard side that prevented most of her guns on that side from firing, which also prevented her from laying alongside Constitution to board. The guns that attempted to fire only managed to set the fallen sail and rigging ablaze. After a battle lasting three hours, Java finally struck her colours and was burned after being judged unsalvageable. Constitution sustained considerable damage to both her hull and rigging. Java had fought hard and had the butcher's bill to show for it.

In single ship battles, superior force was the most significant factor. In response to the majority of the American ships being of greater force than the British ships of the same class, Britain constructed five 40-gun, 24-pounder heavy frigates and two "spar-decked" frigates (the 60-gun  and ) and others. The British Admiralty also instituted a new policy that the three American heavy frigates should not be engaged except by a ship of the line or frigates in squadron strength.

HMS Shannon vs USS Chesapeake. Despite her unlucky reputation Captain James Lawrence took the command of the USS Chesapeake in Boston Harbor in May 1813. Up to 25% of Chesapeake's crew was new, and 50% of her officers. Those men had not practiced either gunnery or small arms. HMS Shannon under Captain Philip Broke was on patrol off of the harbour. In a fleet that largely maintained blockades against the French Navy, most Royal Navy ships rarely practiced their guns. HMS Shannon was an exception. Shannons gunnery practice drills were noted from a Boston hill. However both captains were eager to engage, and both captains were disobeying orders not to engage enemy warships – one on one in duels in Shannon's case. Not at all in Lawrence's case. Captain Broke issued a challenge to Lawrence, who had however sailed to battle before receiving it. Initially Lawrence held the weather gauge but refused to use it, coming up on Shannons weather quarter. From the onset of the battle, Shannons superior small arms musketry told. Of interest, Chesapeake was holding her own with the great guns. Chesapeake lost her forward head-sails and her helmsman, lost way, and tangled rigging with Shannon. By this stage most of her quarterdeck crew were wounded or dead. A boarding action captured Chesapeake at further cost to both crews. Captain Lawrence was mortally wounded and famously cried out to Lieutenant Augustus Ludlow, "Tell the men to fire faster! Don't give up the ship!" Lawrence would die from wounds, Broke would barely survive the boarding action. This would prove to the bloodiest action of the war.

HMS Phoebe vs USS Essex In January 1813, the American frigate , commanded by Captain David Porter, sailed into the Pacific to harass British shipping. Many British whaling ships carried letters of marque allowing them to prey on American whalers, and they had nearly destroyed the American industry. Essex challenged this practice and in turn inflicted considerable damage on British interests. The British dispatched HMS Phoebe and a collection of smaller vessels to hunt down the Essex. Eventually Essex and her consort USS Essex Junior were captured off Valparaíso, Chile by Phoebe and the sloop  on 28 March 1814 in what statistically appears as battle of equal force as Essex and Phoebe were of similar tonnage, scantling and broadside weight. Cherub and Essex Junior were similarly matched. Once again the Americans had more men. Nevertheless, Phoebe was armed with long 18-pounder guns, where as Essex carried heavy but short ranged carronades. This gave the British a decisive long range advantage.

HMS Endymion vs USS President To conclude the cycle of duels caused by the Little Belt affair, USS President was finally captured in January 1815. In her efforts to escape the blockade of New York President grounded on a sandbar but, after incurring damage, managed to break free into the Atlantic. Following the Royal Navy's standing orders, President was pursued by a squadron consisting of four frigates, one being a 56-gun razee. Captain Henry Hope of Endymion had fitted his ship with Philip Broke's gunnery technology as used on Shannon. This gave him the slight advantage at range and he was able to slow President with rigging hits. Commodore Decatur commanding President had the advantage in scantling strength, firepower crew, and tonnage, but not in manoeuvrability. Despite having fewer guns, Endymion was armed with the larger 24-pounders just like President. Using her speed Endymion was able to position herself to rake President and following Broke's philosophy of "Kill the man and the ship is yours", fired into the hull severely damaging her. President was left shot holes below the waterline, ten to fifteen starboard guns disabled, water in the hold and shot from Endymion were later found inside the magazine. Decatur knew his only hope was to damage or disable the Endymions rigging and then outrun the rest of the squadron. However the cumulative damage told and he struck his colours. Both ships then paused to conduct repairs and Decatur took advantage of the fact Endymion had no boats intact to send over a prize crew with and attempted to escape under the cover of night. After the crew of the Endymion had quickly repaired her rigging, she, along with HMS Pomone and HMS Tenedos finally overtook and captured the damaged President. Later Decatur was to give unreliable accounts of the battle stating that President was already "severely damaged" by the grounding before the engagement, but was undamaged after the engagement with Endymion. He stated Pomone caused "significant" losses aboard President, although Presidents crew claim they were below deck gathering their belongings as they had already surrendered. Despite saying "I surrender my ship to the captain of the black frigate", Decatur also writes that he said, "I surrender to the squadron". Nevertheless, many historians such as Ian Toll, Theodore Roosevelt and William James quote Decatur's remarks to either enforce that Endymion alone took President or that President surrendered to the whole squadron, when actually it was something in-between.

The United States Navy's smaller ship-sloops had also won several victories over Royal Navy sloops-of-war of approximately equal armament. Ship rigged vessels are more manoeuvrable in battle because they have a wider variety of sails and thus being more resistant to damage. Ship-rigged vessels can back sail, literally backing up or heave to (stop).

In the only engagement between two brig-sloops the Cruizer-class brig HMS Pelican overwhelmed the USS Argus as she had greater firepower and tonnage, despite having less crew.

USS Enterprise, a schooner that had been converted to a brig, took HMS Boxer a Bold-class gun-brig. These ships were of a comparable size with similar crews. USS Enterprise led a chasing Boxer out on run then turned and let fly at 10 yards. The Boxer replied at the same time. The Boxers captain was killed instantly while Enterprises captain received a mortal wound. The quality of gunnery was better on the Enterprise, de-masting Boxer. Unable to reply when Enterprise took up a raking position, Boxer surrendered.

Privateering 

The operations of American privateers proved a more significant threat to British trade than the United States Navy. They operated throughout the Atlantic until the close of the war, most notably from Baltimore. American privateers reported taking 1300 British merchant vessels, compared to 254 taken by the United States Navy, although the insurer Lloyd's of London reported that only 1,175 British ships were taken, 373 of which were recaptured, for a total loss of 802. Canadian historian Carl Benn wrote that American privateers took 1,344 British ships, of which 750 were retaken by the British. The British tried to limit privateering losses by the strict enforcement of convoy by the Royal Navy and directly by capturing 278 American privateers. Due to the massive size of the British merchant fleet, American captures only affected 7.5% of the fleet, resulting in no supply shortages or lack of reinforcements for British forces in North America. Of 526 American privateers, 148 were captured by the Royal Navy and only 207 ever took a prize.

Due to the large size of their navy, the British did not rely as much on privateering. The majority of the 1,407 captured American merchant ships were taken by the Royal Navy. The war was the last time the British allowed privateering, since the practice was coming to be seen as politically inexpedient and of diminishing value in maintaining its naval supremacy. However, privateering remained popular in British colonies. It was the last hurrah for privateers in Bermuda who vigorously returned to the practice with experience gained in previous wars. The nimble Bermuda sloops captured 298 American ships. Privateer schooners based in British North America, especially from Nova Scotia took 250 American ships and proved especially effective in crippling American coastal trade and capturing American ships closer to shore than the Royal Navy's cruisers.

British blockade 

The naval blockade of the United States began informally in the late fall of 1812. Under the command of British Admiral John Borlase Warren, it extended from South Carolina to Florida. It expanded to cut off more ports as the war progressed. Twenty ships were on station in 1812 and 135 were in place by the end of the conflict. In March 1813, the Royal Navy punished the Southern states, who were most vocal about annexing British North America, by blockading Charleston, Port Royal, Savannah, and New York City as well. Additional ships were sent to North America in 1813 and the Royal Navy tightened and extended the blockade, first to the coast south of Narragansett by November 1813 and to the entire American coast on 31 May 1814. In May 1814, following the abdication of Napoleon and the end of the supply problems with Wellington's army, New England was blockaded.

The British needed American foodstuffs for their army in Spain and benefited from trade with New England, so they did not at first blockade New England. The Delaware River and Chesapeake Bay were declared in a state of blockade on 26 December 1812. Illicit trade was carried on by collusive captures arranged between American traders and British officers. American ships were fraudulently transferred to neutral flags. Eventually, the United States government was driven to issue orders to stop illicit trading. This put only a further strain on the commerce of the country. The British fleet occupied the Chesapeake Bay and attacked and destroyed numerous docks and harbours. The effect was that no foreign goods could enter the United States on ships and only smaller fast boats could attempt to get out. The cost of shipping became very expensive as a result.

The blockade of American ports later tightened to the extent that most American merchant ships and naval vessels were confined to port. The American frigates  and  ended the war blockaded and hulked in New London, Connecticut. USS United States and USS Macedonian attempted to set sail to raid British shipping in the Caribbean, but were forced to turn back when confronted with a British squadron, and by the end of the war, the United States had six frigates and four ships-of-the-line sitting in port. Some merchant ships were based in Europe or Asia and continued operations. Others, mainly from New England, were issued licences to trade by Admiral Warren, commander in chief on the American station in 1813. This allowed Wellington's army in Spain to receive American goods and to maintain the New Englanders' opposition to the war. The blockade nevertheless decreased American exports from $130 million in 1807 to $7 million in 1814. Most exports were goods that ironically went to supply their enemies in Britain or the British colonies. The blockade had a devastating effect on the American economy with the value of American exports and imports falling from $114 million in 1811 down to $20 million by 1814 while the United States Customs took in $13 million in 1811 and $6 million in 1814, even though the Congress had voted to double the rates. The British blockade further damaged the American economy by forcing merchants to abandon the cheap and fast coastal trade to the slow and more expensive inland roads. In 1814, only 1 out of 14 American merchantmen risked leaving port as it was likely that any ship leaving port would be seized.

As the Royal Navy base that supervised the blockade, Halifax profited greatly during the war. From there, British privateers seized and sold many French and American ships. More than a hundred prize vessels were anchored in St. George's Harbour awaiting condemnation by the Admiralty Court when a hurricane struck in 1815, sinking roughly sixty of the vessels.

Freeing and recruiting slaves 

The British Royal Navy's blockades and raids allowed about 4,000 African Americans to escape slavery by fleeing American plantations aboard British ships. American slaves near to the British military rebelled against their masters and made their way to British encampments. The migrants who settled in Canada were known as the Black Refugees. The blockading British fleet in the Chesapeake Bay received increasing numbers of freed slaves during 1813. By British government order, they were considered free persons when they reached British hands. Alexander Cochrane's proclamation of 2 April 1814 invited Americans who wished to emigrate to join the British. Although it did not explicitly mention slaves, it was taken by all as addressed to them. About 2,400 escaped slaves and their families were transported by the Royal Navy to the Royal Naval Dockyard at Bermuda (where they were employed on works about the yard and organized as a militia to aid in the defence of the yard), Nova Scotia and New Brunswick during and after the war. Starting in May 1814, younger male volunteers were recruited into a new Corps of Colonial Marines. They fought for Britain throughout the Atlantic campaign, including the Battle of Bladensburg, the attacks on Washington, D.C., and the Battle of Baltimore, before withdrawing to Bermuda with the rest of the British forces. They were later settled in Trinidad after having rejected orders for transfer to the West India Regiments, forming the community of the Merikins (none of the freed slaves remained in Bermuda after the war). These escaped slaves represented the largest emancipation of African Americans prior to the American Civil War. Britain paid the United States for the financial loss of the slaves at the end of the war.

Treaty of Ghent

Factors leading to the peace negotiations 

By 1814, both Britain and the United States either achieved their main war goals or were weary of the costly stalemate. They both sent delegations to Ghent, a neutral site. The negotiations began in early August and concluded on December 24, when a final agreement was signed as both sides had to ratify it before it could take effect. Meanwhile, both sides planned new invasions.

Negotiations and peace 
In August 1814, peace discussions began. Both sides approached negotiations warily. British diplomats stated their case first, demanding the creation of an Indian barrier state in the American Northwest Territory (the area from Ohio to Wisconsin). It was understood the British would sponsor this state. The British strategy for decades had been to create a buffer state to block American expansion. Britain also demanded naval control of the Great Lakes and access to the Mississippi River. On the American side, Monroe instructed the American diplomats sent to Europe to try to convince the British to cede the Canadas, or at least Upper Canada, to the U.S. At a later stage, the Americans also demanded damages for the burning of Washington and for the seizure of ships before the war began.

American public opinion was outraged when Madison published the demands as even the Federalists were now willing to fight on. The British had planned three invasions. One force burned Washington, but it failed to capture Baltimore and sailed away when its commander was killed. In northern New York State, 10,000 British veterans were marching south until a decisive defeat at the Battle of Plattsburgh forced them back to Canada. Nothing was known of the fate of the third large invasion force aimed at capturing New Orleans and southwest. The prime minister wanted the Duke of Wellington to command in Canada and take control of the Great Lakes. Wellington said that he would go to the United States, but he believed he was needed in Europe. Wellington emphasized that the war was a draw and the peace negotiations should not make territorial demands:

Prime Minister Robert Jenkinson, 2nd Earl of Liverpool, aware of growing opposition to wartime taxation and the demands of Liverpool and Bristol merchants for reopened trade with America, realized Britain also had little to gain and much to lose from prolonged warfare especially given growing concern about the situation in Europe.

After months of negotiations, against a background of changing military victories, defeats and losses, Britain and the United States finally realized that both their nations wanted peace and there was no real reason to continue the war. The main focus of British foreign policy was the Congress of Vienna, at which British diplomats had clashed with Russian and Prussian diplomats over the terms of the peace with France and there were fears that Britain might have to go to war with Russia and Prussia. Each side was now tired of the war. Export trade was all but paralyzed and France was no longer an enemy of Britain after Napoleon fell in 1814, so the Royal Navy no longer needed to stop American shipments to France and it no longer needed to impress more seamen. It had ended the practices that so angered the Americans in 1812. The British were preoccupied in rebuilding Europe after the apparent final defeat of Napoleon.

Consequently, Lord Liverpool urged the British negotiators to offer a peace based on the restoration of the pre-war status quo. The British negotiators duly dropped their demands for the creation of an Indian neutral zone, which allowed negotiations to resume at the end of October. The American negotiators accepted the British proposals for a peace based on the pre-war status quo. Prisoners were to be exchanged and escaped slaves returned to the United States, as at least 3,000 American slaves had escaped to British lines. Many other slaves simply escaped in the chaos of war and achieved freedom on their own. The British however refused to honor this aspect of the treaty, settling some of the newly freed slaves in Nova Scotia. Four hundred freedmen were settled in New Brunswick. The Americans protested Britain's failure to return American slaves in violation of the Treaty of Ghent. After arbitration by the Tsar of Russia the British paid $1,204,960 in damages to Washington, to reimburse the slave owners.
 
On 24 December 1814, the diplomats had finished and signed the Treaty of Ghent. The treaty was ratified by the British Prince Regent three days later on 27 December. On 17 February, it arrived in Washington, where it was quickly ratified and went into effect, ending the war. The terms called for all occupied territory to be returned, the prewar boundary between Canada and the United States to be restored, and the Americans were to gain fishing rights in the Gulf of Saint Lawrence. The British insisted on the inclusion of provisions in Article IX of the treaty which called on both signatories to restore to the Indians "all possessions, rights and privileges which they may have enjoyed, or been entitled to in 1811". The inherent flaw in the British demand was the assumption that the Indian tribes were independent, however, they were only considered dwellers in the United States who had recently made war upon her in co-operation with Great Britain. Subsequently, the Americans did not comply with these provisions and the British made no effort to compel them to do so.

Much like the Congress of Vienna, the Treaty of Ghent completely maintained Britain's maritime belligerent rights, a key goal for the British, without acknowledging American maritime rights or the end of impressment. While American maritime rights were not seriously violated in the century of peace until World War I, the defeat of Napoleon made the need for impressment irrelevant and the grievances of the United States no longer an issue. In this sense, the United States achieved its goals indirectly and felt its honour had been upheld.

Losses and compensation 

Losses figures do not include deaths among Canadian militia forces or losses among Indian tribes. British losses in the war were about 1,160 killed in action and 3,679 wounded, with 3,321 British who died from disease. American losses were 2,260 killed in action and 4,505 wounded. While the number of Americans who died from disease is not known, it is estimated that about 15,000 died from all causes directly related to the war.

There have been no estimates of the cost of the American war to Britain, but it did add some £25 million to its national debt. In the United States, the cost was $105 million, about the same as the cost to Britain. The national debt rose from $45 million in 1812 to $127 million by the end of 1815, although by selling bonds and treasury notes at deep discounts—and often for irredeemable paper money due to the suspension of specie payment in 1814—the government received only $34 million worth of specie. Stephen Girard, the richest man in the United States at the time, was one of those who funded the United States government's involvement in the war. The British national debt rose from £451 million in 1812 to £841 million in 1814, although this was at a time when Britain was fighting a war against Napoleon. The war was bad for both economies.

In the United States, the economy grew every year from 1812 to 1815, despite a large loss of business by East Coast shipping interests. Prices were 15% higher—inflated—in 1815 compared to 1812, an annual rate of 4.8%. The national economy grew 1812–1815 at 3.7% a year, after accounting for inflation. Per capita GDP grew at 2.2% a year, after accounting for inflation. Hundreds of new banks were opened; they largely handled the loans that financed the war since tax revenues were down. Money that would have been spent on foreign trade was diverted to opening new factories, which were profitable since British factory-made products were not for sale. This gave a major boost to the Industrial Revolution in the United States as typified by the Boston Associates. The Boston Manufacturing Company, built the first integrated spinning and weaving factory in the world at Waltham, Massachusetts in 1813.

Long-term consequences 

The border between the United States and Canada remained essentially unchanged by the war, with neither side gaining meaningful amounts of territory. Despite the Treaty of Ghent not addressing the original points of contention and establishing the status quo ante bellum, relations between the United States and Britain changed drastically. The issue of impressment also became irrelevant as the Royal Navy no longer needed sailors after the war.

The long-term results of the war were generally satisfactory for both the United States and Great Britain. Except for occasional border disputes and some tensions during and after the American Civil War, relations between the United States and Britain remained peaceful for the rest of the 19th century. In the 20th century, spurred by multiple world conflicts, the two countries became close allies. Historian Troy Bickham argues that each participant defined success in a different way; the new American republic could claim victory in its independence from London being assured, and Native American opposition to westward expansion was removed. The memory of the conflict played a major role in helping to consolidate a Canadian national identity after 1867, the year of Canadian confederation. The British retained Canada, but their attention was overwhelmingly devoted to celebrating the defeat of Napoleon.

The Rush–Bagot Treaty between the United States and Britain was enacted in 1817. It demilitarized the Great Lakes and Lake Champlain, where many British naval arrangements and forts still remained. The treaty laid the basis for a demilitarized boundary. It remains in effect to this day.

Britain defeated the American invasions of Canada and its own invasion of the United States was defeated in Maryland, New York and New Orleans. After two decades of intense warfare against France, Britain was in no mood for further conflict with the United States and focused on expanding the British Empire into India. Border adjustments between the United States and British North America were made in the Treaty of 1818.

Bermuda 

Bermuda had been largely left to the defences of its own militia and privateers before American independence, but the Royal Navy had begun buying up land and operating from there beginning in 1795. As construction work progressed through the first half of the 19th century, Bermuda became the permanent naval headquarters in Western waters, housing the Admiralty and serving as a base and dockyard. Defence infrastructure remained the central leg of Bermuda's economy until after World War II.

Canadas 

After the war, pro-British leaders in Upper Canada demonstrated a strong hostility to American influences, including republicanism, which shaped its policies. Immigration from the United States was discouraged and favour was shown to the Anglican Church as opposed to the more Americanized Methodist Church.

The Battle of York showed the vulnerability of Upper and Lower Canada. In the decades following the war, several projects were undertaken to improve the defence of the colonies against the United States. They included work on La Citadelle at Quebec City, Fort Henry at Kingston, and rebuilding Fort York at York. Additionally, work began on the Halifax Citadel to defend the port against foreign navies. Akin to the American view that it was a "Second War of Independence" for the United States, the war was also somewhat of a war of independence for Canada. Before the war Canada was a mix of French Canadians, native-born British subjects, loyalists and Americans who migrated there. Historian Donal Hickey maintains that the war that threatened Canada greatly helped to cement these disparate groups into a unified nation.

Indigenous nations 

The Indian tribes allied to the British lost their cause. The Americans rejected the British proposal to create an "Indian barrier state" in the American West at the Ghent peace conference and it never resurfaced. Donald Fixico argues that "[a]fter the War of 1812, the U.S. negotiated over two hundred Indian treaties that involved the ceding of Indian lands and 99 of these agreements resulted in the creation of reservations west of the Mississippi River".

The indigenous nations lost most of their fur-trapping territory. Indigenous nations were displaced in Alabama, Georgia, New York and Oklahoma, losing most of what is now Indiana, Michigan, Ohio and Wisconsin within the Northwest Territory as well as in New York and the South. They came to be seen as an undesirable burden by British policymakers, who now looked to the United States for markets and raw materials. Everyone, including British fur traders were prohibited from entering in the United States for purposes of trade.

British Indian agents however continued to meet regularly with their former allies among the tribes of the Old Northwest, but refused to supply them with arms or help them resist American attempts to displace them. The American government rapidly built a network of forts throughout the Old Northwest, thus establishing firm military control. It also sponsored American fur traders, who outcompeted the British fur traders. Meanwhile, Euro-American settlers rapidly migrated into the Old Northwest, into the lands occupied by the tribes who were previously allied with the British.

After the decisive defeat of the Creek Indians at the Battle of Horseshoe Bend in 1814, some Creek warriors escaped to join the Seminole in Florida. The remaining Creek chiefs signed away about half their lands, comprising 23,000,000 acres, covering much of southern Georgia and two-thirds of modern Alabama. The Creek were separated from any future help from the Spanish in Florida and from the Choctaw and Chickasaw to the west.

After much confrontation between settlers and tribes, and failed attempts to assimilate Indians to a life of farming and ranching, they were ultimately sent to various reservations. The War of 1812 marked a turning point in the history of the Old Northwest because it established United States authority over the British and Indians of that border region.

United Kingdom 
The war is seldom remembered in the United Kingdom. The massive ongoing conflict in Europe against the French Empire under Napoleon ensured that the British did not consider the War of 1812 against the United States as more than a sideshow. Britain's blockade of French trade had been entirely successful, and the Royal Navy was the world's dominant nautical power (and remained so for another century). While the land campaigns had contributed to saving Canada, the Royal Navy had shut down American commerce, bottled up the United States Navy in port and widely suppressed privateering. British businesses, some affected by rising insurance costs, were demanding peace so that trade could resume with the United States. The peace was generally welcomed by the British, although there was disquiet about the rapid growth of the United States. However, the two nations quickly resumed trade after the end of the war and a growing friendship over time.

Historian Donald R. Hickey maintains that for Britain, "the best way to defend Canada was to accommodate the United States. This was the principal rationale for Britain's long-term policy of rapprochement with the United States in the nineteenth century and explains why they were so often willing to sacrifice other imperial interests to keep the republic happy".

United States 

The nation gained a strong sense of complete independence as people celebrated their "second war of independence". Nationalism soared after the victory at the Battle of New Orleans. The opposition Federalist Party collapsed due to its opposition to the war and the Era of Good Feelings ensued.

No longer questioning the need for a strong Navy, the United States built three new 74-gun ships of the line and two new 44-gun frigates shortly after the end of the war. Another frigate had been destroyed to prevent its capture on the stocks when Washington had been burned. In 1816, the United States Congress passed into law an "Act for the gradual increase of the Navy" at a cost of $1,000,000 a year for eight years, authorizing nine ships of the line and 12 heavy frigates. The captains and commodores of the Navy became the heroes of their generation in the United States. Decorated plates and pitchers of Decatur, Hull, Bainbridge, Lawrence, Perry, and Macdonough were made in Staffordshire, England, and found a ready market in the United States. Several war heroes used their fame to win elections to national office. Andrew Jackson and William Henry Harrison both benefited from their military successes to win the presidency, while representative Richard Mentor Johnson's role during the war helped him attain the vice presidency.

During the war, New England states became increasingly frustrated over how the war was being conducted and how the conflict affected them. They complained that the United States government was not investing enough militarily and financially in the states' defences and that the states should have more control over their militias. Increased taxes, the British blockade, and the occupation of some of New England by enemy forces also agitated public opinion in the states. At the Hartford Convention held between December 1814 and January 1815, Federalist delegates deprecated the war effort and sought more autonomy for the New England states. They did not call for secession but word of the angry anti-war resolutions appeared as peace was announced and the victory at New Orleans was known. The upshot was that the Federalists were permanently discredited and quickly disappeared as a major political force.

This war enabled thousands of slaves to escape to freedom, despite the difficulties. The British helped numerous Black Refugees resettle in New Brunswick and Nova Scotia, where Black Loyalists had also been granted land after the American Revolutionary War.

Jackson invaded Florida in 1818, demonstrating to Spain that it could no longer control that territory with a small force. Spain sold Florida to the United States in 1819 under the Adams–Onís Treaty following the First Seminole War. Pratt concludes that "[t]hus indirectly the War of 1812 brought about the acquisition of Florida. [...] To both the Northwest and the South, therefore, the War of 1812 brought substantial benefits. It broke the power of the Creek Confederacy and opened to settlement a great province of the future Cotton Kingdom".

Historiography

See also 

 Bibliography of early United States naval history
 Bibliography of the War of 1812
 Elgin Military Museum
 Indiana in the War of 1812
 Kentucky in the War of 1812
 List of War of 1812 battles
 Patriot War (Florida)
 Sixty Years' War
 Timeline of the War of 1812
 War of 1812 campaigns

Notes

References

Bibliography

 
 
 
 
 
 
 
 
 
 
 
 
 
 
 

 
 
 
 
 
 

 
 
 
 
 
 
 
 
 
 
 
 
 
 
 
 
 
 
 
 
 
 
 
 
 
 

 
 
 
 
 
 
 
 
 
 
 
 
 
 
 
 
 
 
 
 
 
 
 
 

 
 
 
 
 
 
 
 
 
 
 

 
 
 
 
 
 

 
 
 
 
 
 
 

 
 
 
 
 
 
 
 
 
  From the Canadian Encyclopedia.

Further reading 

 Benn, Carl, ed. A Mohawk Memoir from the War of 1812: John Norton-Teyoninhokarawen (U of Toronto Press, 2019)
 
 
 
 
 
 
 
 
 
  Historiography.
 
 
 
 
 
 
 
 
 
  
 
 
 
 
 
 
 
 
 
 
 
 
 
 
 
 
 Ward, John William 1955. Andrew Jackson, Symbol for an Age. New York: Oxford University Press.

External links 

 The War of 1812, Government of Canada website.
 The War of 1812, Department of National Defence (Canada) website.
 Library of Congress Guide to the War of 1812, Kenneth Drexler.
 The War of 1812 in the South, The William C. Cook Collection, The Williams Research Center, The Historic New Orleans Collection.
 American Military History, Chapter 6 – The War of 1812, Office of the Chief of Military History, United States Army, 1989.
 War of 1812 collection William L. Clements Library.
 
 
 Key Events of the War of 1812, chart by Greg D. Feldmeth, Polytechnic School (Pasadena, California), 1998.
 
 
 Black Americans in the U.S. Military from the American Revolution to the Korean War: The War of 1812, David Omahen, New York State Military Museum and Veteran Research Center, 2006.
 President Madison's War Message, lesson plan with extensive list of documents, EDSitement.com (National Endowment for the Humanities).
 PBS Documentary The War of 1812 .
 
 Indexed eLibrary of War of 1812 Resources  at Fire Along the Frontier Resource Site.
 Illustrated War of 1812 Timelines  at Fire Along the Frontier Resource Site.
 The War of 1812 Website.
 The War of 1812 Website: Reenactment Groups.
 BBC Radio 4: In Our Time. The War of 1812, 31 January 2013.
 Indiana University Lilly Library Digital Collection of War of 1812 .
 The War: A War of 1812 Newspaper, Brock University Library Digital Repository.
 War of 1812 Collection, Brock University Library Digital Repository.

 
British Indian Department
Canada in the War of 1812
Canadian Militia
First Nations history
History of indigenous peoples of the Americas
History of United States expansionism
Invasions of Canada
Invasions of the United States
Slavery in the United States
1812
Wars between the United Kingdom and the United States
1812
1812